Neottiella is a genus of fungi in the family Pyronemataceae. It was circumscribed by Italian mycologist Pier Andrea Saccardo in 1889.

Species
Neottiella albocincta
Neottiella aphanodictyon
Neottiella carneorufa
Neottiella crozalsiana
Neottiella hetieri
Neottiella hoehneliana
Neottiella ithacaensis
Neottiella macrospora
Neottiella microspora
Neottiella ricciicola
Neottiella rutilans
Neottiella sericeovillosa
Neottiella trabutiana
Neottiella vivida

References

Pezizales genera
Pyronemataceae